Berdi Bayrammyradovich Shamyradov or Berdi Baýrammyradowiç Şamyradow (born 22 June 1982)  is a Turkmen football coach and a former professional player. Currently, he works as assistant manager at FC Nebitçi Balkanabat.

Early life
Football started in six years. First coach — Andreý Skripçenko. Then worked with Boris Grigorýans.

He graduated from the International Turkmen-Turkish University.

Club career
Professional career began at Ahal FK.

In the 1st half of 2004/05 season he played for Azerbaijan Karvan FK. However performed badly, so never and can not be distinguished.

He is six-times top goalscorer of Ýokary Liga. In 2009, Şamyradow shattered the all-times Ýokary Liga top scorer title of Rejepmyrat Agabaýew. In 2010, he became all-time Ýokary Liga top scorer.

In 2013, at HTTU early in the season won the Supercup of Turkmenistan, and at the end of the season won the gold medal in the 2013 Ýokary Liga

Season 2014 started as a player Altyn Asyr FK. Won the gold medal in the 2014 Ýokary Liga.

From 2015 FC Aşgabat player.

International career
Şamyradow scored his first international goal in the 2008 Ho Chi Minh City International Football Cup against hosts Vietnam, helping Turkmenistan win the tournament.
Together with the team twice went to the AFC Challenge Cup final.

Coaching career 
After completing his football career, he worked as a teacher at the Turkmen State Institute of Physical Education and Sports.

In the spring of 2020, Şamyradow got a job at Sports School No. 10 of the Main Department of Sports and Youth Policy of Ashgabat.

In August 2020, he was appointed an assistant coach at FC Nebitçi with Amangylyç Koçumow as the head coach.

International goals

Honors
AFC Challenge Cup:
Runners-up: 2010, 2012

Ho Chi Minh City International Football Cup
Winner: 2008

References

External links

 

Living people
1982 births
Turkmenistan footballers
Turkmenistan expatriate footballers
Turkmenistan international footballers
Expatriate footballers in Azerbaijan
Turkmenistan expatriate sportspeople in Azerbaijan
Association football forwards
Sportspeople from Ashgabat
FC Aşgabat players